Yahya ibn Mahmud al-Wasiti was a 13th-century Iraqi-Arab  painter and calligrapher, noted for his illustrations of al-Hariri's Maqamat.

Biography 
In 1237 he transcribed and illustrated a copy of al-Hariri's Maqamat typically shortened to Maqamat, and also known as the Assemblies, a series of anecdotes of social satire written by Al-Hariri of Basra. Al-Wasiti's illustrations, which are among the finest examples of a style used in the 13th-century, served as an inspiration for the modern Baghdad art movement in the 20th-century.

Very little is known about his life. He was from the 13th century school of painting. He was known for his articulate painting style.

Illustrations from Maqamat

In total, Maqmat has 96 illustrations, all by al-Wasiti. They are of "outstanding quality with fine composition, expressive figures, and vivid but controlled colours"  and provide readers with "fascinating series of glimpses into and commentaries on 13th-century Islāmic life."

See also

Arabic literature
Culture of Iraq
Islamic art
List of Iraqi artists

References

13th-century Arabs
13th-century people from the Abbasid Caliphate
Arab artists
Muslim artists
Manuscript illuminators
Iraqi calligraphers
Iraqi painters
Painters of the medieval Islamic world
13th-century painters